Herbert Fowler may refer to:

 George Herbert Fowler (1861–1940), English zoologist, historian and archivist
 William Herbert Fowler (also known as Herbert Fowler, 1856–1941), English cricketer
 Herb Fowler, American architect who lived at Deepwood House, Fayetteville, Arkansas, U.S.